Yinchuan–Lanzhou high-speed railway is a high-speed railway in China between Lanzhou, the capital of Gansu province, and Zhongwei in Ningxia. Construction started in 2017 and completed on 29 December 2022. The section between Zhongchuan Airport and Lanzhou West is the already completed Lanzhou-Zhongchuan Airport Intercity Railway. This section will also be shared with the Lanzhou–Zhangye intercity railway.

History
The line was built in two sections. A  section from Yinchuan to Zhongwei, opened on 29 December 2019. The remaining section opened on 29 December 2022.

References

High-speed railway lines in China
Rail transport in Gansu
Rail transport in Ningxia
Standard gauge railways in China